Darko Savić (Serbian Cyrillic: Дарко Caвић; born 19 January 1979) is a retired Serbian footballer who played as a defender and currently manager of Septemvri Sofia II. He has played much of his career in a centre back role, but he has also been used as a right back.

Career 
Savić began his career with Sartid Smederevo, before transferring to OFK Beograd in June 2000. After five years of playing in the Serbian Superliga, he was signed by Spartak Varna in the summer of 2002.

Spartak Varna 
Savić made his Bulgarian A PFG debut on 10 August 2002, replacing Stefan Donchev in a 3–1 away loss against CSKA Sofia. Seven days later, he made his first start for Spartak, in a 1–0 loss against Lokomotiv Plovdiv at Spartak Stadium.

On 24 February 2004, Savić scored an own goal in a 2–1 home loss against Cherno More in the derby of Varna.

Lokomotiv Sofia 
On 3 September 2004, Savić joined Lokomotiv Sofia on a free transfer. He made his first league appearance for Lokomotiv in the 4–0 defeat by Lokomotiv Plovdiv on 11 September.

On 18 April 2009, he scored his first goal in Bulgaria in a 3–2 win over Cherno More, opening the scoring with a trademark strike from 25 yards out. On 31 May Savić was sent off in a match against his previous side Spartak Varna for a foul on Angel Stoykov.

On 11 April 2011, Savić became the second foreign player after Nebojša Jelenković, who has made 200 appearances in the Bulgarian A PFG. As of March 2015, he has played 246 matches in the top division of Bulgarian football, being third in the all-time appearance list for foreigners. Savić is also the non-Bulgarian defender with the most games. It was announced on 10 June 2011 that, along with Valentin Galev, Kristian Dobrev, Marcho Dafchev and Rumen Goranov, Savić had agreed to sign a new two-year contract, which would keep him with Lokomotiv until 2013. The contract was finally signed on 19 June.

On 9 February 2012, his contract with Lokomotiv was terminated.

Botev Vratsa 
On 14 February 2012, Savić joined Botev Vratsa. He made his debut for Botev in a 1–0 home loss against Slavia Sofia on 3 March.

Managerial career
On 23 August 2019, Savić was appointed manager of Sportist Svoge. He was fired on 4 January 2020.

In February 2020, Savić was appointed manager of OFK Kostinbrod. He left the position shortly before the start of the 2021–22 season.

Career statistics
Updated 8 May 2016

References

External links
 Career story at Semedrija.com (FK Smederevo fans official site) 
 

1979 births
Living people
Serbian footballers
Association football defenders
First Professional Football League (Bulgaria) players
OFK Beograd players
FK Smederevo players
PFC Spartak Varna players
FC Lokomotiv 1929 Sofia players
FC Botev Vratsa players
FC Sportist Svoge players
People from Vršac